Polyzoa is a genus of ascidian tunicates in the family Styelidae. In older literature, Polyzoa was used as the name of the phylum Bryozoa.

Species within the genus Polyzoa include:
 Polyzoa atlantica Sanamyan et al., 2009 
 Polyzoa exigua Kott, 1990 
 Polyzoa insularis Millar, 1967 
 Polyzoa minor Monniot, 1970 
 Polyzoa nodosa Kott, 1990 
 Polyzoa opuntia Lesson, 1830 
 Polyzoa pacifica Tokioka, 1951 
 Polyzoa translucida Ritter & Forsyth, 1917 
 Polyzoa vesiculiphora Tokioka, 1951 
 Polyzoa violacea (Oka, 1915)

Species names currently considered to be synonyms:
 Polyzoa coccinea (Cunningham, 1871): synonym of Polyzoa opuntia Lesson, 1830 
 Polyzoa depressa (Oka, 1926): synonym of Polyzoa violacea (Oka, 1915) 
 Polyzoa falclandica Michaelsen, 1900: synonym of Polyzoa opuntia Lesson, 1830 
 Polyzoa falklandica Michaelsen, 1900: synonym of Polyzoa opuntia Lesson, 1830 
 Polyzoa gordiana Michaelsen, 1900: synonym of Polyzoa opuntia Lesson, 1830 
 Polyzoa herdmani Michaelsen, 1900: synonym of Polyzoa opuntia Lesson, 1830 
 Polyzoa lennoxensis Michaelsen, 1900: synonym of Polyzoa opuntia Lesson, 1830 
 Polyzoa pictonis Michaelsen, 1900: synonym of Polyzoa opuntia Lesson, 1830 
 Polyzoa reticulata (Herdman, 1886): synonym of Chorizocormus reticulatus Herdman, 1886 
 Polyzoa sagamiana Tokioka, 1953: synonym of Polyzoa violacea (Oka, 1915)

References

Stolidobranchia
Tunicate genera